Tritantaechmes (Elamite: Ṣi-iš-šá-an-tak-ma, Babylonian: Ši-it-ra-an-taḫ-ma) was a king of the Sagartians, who ruled in Arbela (521 BCE). He claimed to be a descendant of Cyaxares of the Median Empire.

He was crucified by Darius I.

See also
Skunkha

References 

6th-century BC rulers
6th-century BC Iranian people
People executed by crucifixion
People executed by the Achaemenid Empire